Young, Rich & Dangerous is the third and final studio album by American hip hop duo Kris Kross. It was produced by Jermaine Dupri and released in 1996 by So So Def Recordings. Two hit singles were released from the album, "Tonite's tha Night" and "Live and Die for Hip-Hop". "Live and Die for Hip-Hop" featured Da Brat, Aaliyah, Jermaine Dupri and Mr. Black. Despite some positive reviews, Young, Rich & Dangerous was the least successful album for Kris Kross. It was certified Gold by the RIAA on March 4, 1996.

Track listing 
"Some Cut Up" - 1:45
"When the Homies Show Up" - 1:31
"Tonite's tha Night" - 3:16
"Interview" - 0:39
"Young, Rich and Dangerous" - 3:50
"Live and Die for Hip Hop" featuring Da Brat, Aaliyah, Jermaine Dupri & Mr. Black - 3:43
"Money, Power and Fame (Three Thangs Thats Necessities)" Featuring Chris Terry - 3:48
"It's a Group Thang" - 0:51
"Mackin' Ain't Easy" featuring Mr. Black - 2:58
"Da Streets Ain't Right" - 3:00
"Hey Sexy" Featuring Chris Terry - 3:40
"Tonite's tha Night (Remix)" - 3:41

Samples
"Tonite's Tha Night"
"Riding High" by Faze-O
"Da Streets Ain't Right"
"Talking in Your Sleep" by The Romantics
"Warning" by The Notorious B.I.G.
"Live and Die for Hip Hop"
"Baby Come to Me" by Regina Belle 
"Mackin' Ain't Easy"
"Love Will Find a Way" by Lionel Richie
"Money, Power and Fame (Three Thangs Thats Necessities)"
"I Need Love" by LL Cool J
"Some Cut Up"
"Intimate Connection" by Kleeer 
"Tonight's Tha Night" (Remix)
"Deep Cover" by Dr. Dre

Charts

Weekly charts

Year-end charts

Certifications

References

Kris Kross albums
1996 albums
Albums produced by Jermaine Dupri